Matadjana is a sub-prefecture of Wadi Fira Region in Chad.

References 

Populated places in Chad